Thylactus sumatrensis is a species of beetle in the family Cerambycidae. It was described by Karl-Ernst Hüdepohl in 1987. It is known from Sumatra and Borneo.

References

Xylorhizini
Beetles described in 1987